Brock is a township in the Regional Municipality of Durham, Ontario, Canada.  Brock Township is also a former municipality and geographic township prior to the amalgamation that formed the current municipality.

The Trent–Severn Waterway forms part of the northern border of the municipality, which enters Lake Simcoe through Ramara Township. There are five locks in Brock. Thorah Island in Lake Simcoe is within the municipal boundaries of Brock.

History
The original Brock Township was surveyed in 1817 as part of York County and the first meetings were held in 1833.  The township was named for Major General Sir Isaac Brock (1769–1812) whose estate received free land here for his service in the War of 1812.  William Bagshaw became Brock's first Postmaster and Justice of the Peace in 1819 when he owned property on Concession 9. Other early, settler ancestors included names like: Acton, Charters, Dusto, Purvis, Rundle, Bagshaw, Doble, Phair, St. John, Umphrey, Brethour, Doyle, Fallowdown, Ruddy and Vrooman (for whom the semi-ghost town of Vroomanton was named).

In 1852, the Township became part of the newly created Ontario County.  In 1878, Cannington was incorporated as a village and was no longer part of the Township for municipal purposes.

In 1974, as part of the municipal restructuring around the creation of the Regional Municipality of Durham, Brock was amalgamated with Thorah Township and the villages of Beaverton and Cannington to form the new Township of Brock.

Communities
Beaverton is the largest community and commercial centre of the township, while Cannington is home to the municipal administration and local high school.

Beaverton is the commercial and financial centre for the township, and several stores, services and entertainment facilities are located there.  Several chain outlets such as McDonald's, Independent Grocer and Tim Hortons are located along Highway 12.

Smaller communities in the township include Ball Subdivision, Blackwater, Cedar Beach, Creightons Corners, Derryville, Gamebridge, Layton, Maple Beach, Port Bolster, Pinedale, Saginaw, Sunderland, Thorah Beach, Vallentyne, Vroomanton, Wick and Wilfrid.

Local Government

Brock is governed by a mayor, a Regional Councillor and five Councillors, each representing one of the five municipal wards. As of the 2018 election, the elected council members are:

Mayor: John Grant
Regional Councillor: Ted Smith
Councillors: 
 Ward 1: Michael Jubb
 Ward 2: Claire Doble
 Ward 3: Walter Schummer
 Ward 4: Cria Pettingill
 Ward 5: Lynn Campbell

The township faced controversy following the 2010 municipal election, in which then-incumbent mayor Larry O'Connor was reelected by a margin of just 13 votes over Terry Clayton. The narrow margin resulted in a judicial recount battle, and O'Connor resigned as mayor on March 28, 2011. The municipal council subsequently appointed Clayton as mayor.

Demographics 

According to the 2016 Census, 94% of Brock residents have English as their mother tongue (one of the highest percentages in the Greater Toronto Area). No other mother tongue reaches 1%. The residents of Brock are older with a median age of 46.5 compared to the provincial average of 41.3.

Notable people
 George Arthur Welsh – decorated World War I and World War II flying ace hero
 Duncan Macpherson – editorial cartoonist
 Basil McRae – former NHL player
 Hugh Livingstone Macneil – southern California pioneer, born in Wick

See also
 List of townships in Ontario

References

External links

Township municipalities in Ontario
Lower-tier municipalities in Ontario
Municipalities in the Regional Municipality of Durham
Populated places established in 1833
1833 establishments in Upper Canada